Dil Ka Raaja is a 1972 Bollywood action film produced by A. A. Nadiadwala and directed by P. Madhavan. It stars Raaj Kumar, Waheeda Rehman, Leena Chandavarkar in lead roles. The film was a remake of Tamil film Enga Oor Raja.

Cast
Raaj Kumar as Raja Vichitra Singh / Raj Singh "Raju" (Double Role)  
Waheeda Rehman as Laxmi Singh
Leena Chandavarkar as Geeta
Bindu as Rani
Ajit as Thakur Gajendra Singh
Indrani Mukherjee as Gauri Singh
Jagdeep as Bajrang Singh

Music

External links
 

1972 films
1970s Hindi-language films
1970s action drama films
Films scored by R. D. Burman
Films directed by P. Madhavan
Hindi remakes of Tamil films
Indian action drama films